Nakash is both a surname and a given name. Notable people with the name include:

Joseph Nakash (born 1942), American businessman
Ran Nakash (born 1978), Israeli boxer
Nakash Aziz (born 1985), Indian composer and singer